Nik Mohamad Abduh bin Nik Abdul Aziz (born 22 March 1970) is a Malaysian politician who has served as Chairman of the South Kelantan Development Authority (KESEDAR) since May 2020. He served as the Member of Parliament (MP) for Bachok from May 2018 to November 2022 and for Pasir Mas from May 2013 to May 2018. He is a member of the Malaysian Islamic Party (PAS), a component party of the Perikatan Nasional (PN) and formerly Pakatan Rakyat (PR) coalitions.

Background

Nik Abduh was born on 22 March 1970. He started his studies at the Kedai Lalat Primary School, Kota Kambing. He later continued his secondary education in Madrasah Nurul Anuar and Maahad Muhammadi. After graduating high school, he continued his religious studies in Lucknow, India as well as Darul Uloom, Deoband, India and also Al Azhar University, Cairo, Egypt.

Career

Upon graduation, he resigned as an educator:

1. Maahad Muhammadi (boys' school) in 1995 (for 7 months) 

2. Maahad Muhammadi (girls' school) (1997–1998) 

3. 1st Assistant Teacher (GPK1) in Maahad Darul Anuar (1998–1999)  

4. Mudir in Maahad Darul Anuar (2000–2002) 

5. Attending Nun Berhad Academy (2003) 

6. Principals in Tahfiz Maahad and Nikmatillah Religious Studies (2004–2007).

In addition, he was also a Member of Council Kota Bharu Municipal Council for 8 years.

Politics 

In the political arena, Ustaz Nik Abduh has held several positions at the Center up to the Branch. He has various positions in PAS. The following show which positions he has held :

Center

1. Syura Council Members (2015–2020) 

2. Central PAS Working committee members (2013–2015) 

3. Central PAS Working committee members (2017–Present)

Youth

1. Chairman of PAS Youth Council Youth PAS Malaysia (2015–2017) 

2. Deputy Chairman of PAS Youth Council Malaysia (2011–2013) 

3. PAS Youth Council Exco Malaysia (2007–2011) 

4. Kelantan PAS Youth Council deputy chairperson (2007–2009) 

5. Kelantan PAS Youth Council Exco (2001–2007) 
 
Area

Head of PAS Youth Council for Pengkalan Chepa (2001–2009)

Branch

Member of the PAS Committee of the Melaka Island Branch.

He contested for the first time in the 13th General Election in 2013 at the Pasir Mas seat and won the seat after defeating Independent candidate Dato' Ibrahim Ali.

Nik Mohamad Abduh now holds the Bachok parliamentary seat after winning the last General Election by defeating Barisan Nasional, Awang Adek Hussin and Pakatan Harapan candidate Zulkifli Zakaria by 3,292.

Issues

Brother detained under ISA
His brother Nik Adli was held under the Malaysian Internal Security Act in 2001 for alleged terrorist activities including planning jihad, possession of weapons, and membership in the Kumpulan Mujahidin Malaysia (KMM), an Islamist extremist group. After 5 years in detention without trial, he was released.

Election results

References

Members of the Dewan Rakyat
21st-century Malaysian politicians
Living people
1969 births
People from Kelantan
Malaysian people of Malay descent
Malaysian Islamic Party politicians